Jane Watson (born 7 March 1990) is a New Zealand netball international. She was a member of the New Zealand teams that won the 2019 Netball World Cup and the 2021 Constellation Cup. Watson has also played for both Mainland Tactix and
Southern Steel in the ANZ Championship and the ANZ Premiership. In 2017 she was a member of the Steel team that won the inaugural ANZ Premiership title. She was named ANZ Premiership Player of the Year in both 2017 and 2020. In April 2022, Watson was included on a list of the 25 best players to feature in netball leagues in New Zealand since 1998.

Early life, family and education
Watson was born and raised on South Island. She is the daughter of Mary and Ross Watson. She initially grew  up on her parents farm in Cave before the Watsons moved south to a new farm at Millers Flat on the Clutha River. As a youngster, she played association football and only began playing netball because her school in Millers Flat didn't have a football team. Between 2005 and 2007, Watson attended St Kevin's College, Oamaru as a boarder. In her last year at St Kevin's, Watson suffered from heart problems and subsequently had to wear a pacemaker for three years from the age of 17. In 2010, at the age of 20, she also dealt with the death of her partner. After returning from escorting his body to Samoa, she caught diphtheria. Watson spent three days in isolation at Timaru Hospital before being transferred to Christchurch Hospital. She lost significant weight from the illness. Between 2008 and 2010, Watson attended Lincoln University on a netball scholarship and gained a degree in Recreation Management specialising in sport. Between 2011 and 2012 she attended the University of Canterbury where she gained a Post Graduate Diploma in Teaching and Learning.

Playing career

Early years
In 2011, Watson was a member of a Canterbury team that finished as runners-up to Otago in the under-21 final at Netball New Zealand's Age Group tournament. She was subsequently included in the under-21 team of the tournament.

Lincoln University
Watson played netball for Lincoln University in local Canterbury competitions.

Mainland Tactix
Between 2012 and 2014, Watson made 30 senior appearances for Mainland Tactix in the ANZ Championship. After three seasons playing for Southern Steel, Watson re-joined Tactix ahead of the 2018 ANZ Premiership season. Watson captained Tactix between 2018 and 2021. On 5 May 2019, Watson made her 100th senior league appearance during a 2019 Round 11 match against Northern Stars. 
In 2020 and 2021, Watson 
captained Tactix to two successive grand finals. In 2020 she was also named ANZ Premiership Player of the Year. In April 2022, Watson was included on a list of the 25 best players to feature in netball leagues in New Zealand since 1998. Watson will miss the 2022 ANZ Premiership season due to pregnancy.  In June 2022, Watson announced she would back in 2023 to play for Tactix.

Southern Steel
Between 2015 and 2017, Watson played for Southern Steel, initially in the ANZ Championship and later in the ANZ Premiership. In 2016 she was a member of the Steel team that finished the season as minor premiers. She also played her 50th ANZ Championship game. In 2017 she was a member of the Steel team that won both the inaugural ANZ Premiership and Super Club titles. She was subsequently named 2017 ANZ Premiership Player of the Year

ANZ Premiership statistics

|- style="background-color: #eaeaea"
! scope="row" style="text-align:center" | 2017
|style="text-align:center;"|Steel
|0/0||?||18||?||?||41||104||109||3||16 
|- 
! scope="row" style="text-align:center" | 2018
|style="text-align:center;"|Tactix
||0/0||?||19||?||?||31||71||127||34||16 
|- style="background-color: #eaeaea"
! scope="row" style="text-align:center" | 2019
|style="text-align:center;"|Tactix
||0/0||0||30||25||0||40||96||117||14||15
|- 
! scope="row" style="text-align:center" | 2020
|style="text-align:center;"|Tactix
|0/0||5||15||99||10||20||72||75||19||15
|- style="background-color: #eaeaea"
! scope="row" style="text-align:center" | 2021
|style="text-align:center;"|Tactix
|0/0||0||12||0||0||15||78||109||10||17
|- class="sortbottom"
! colspan=2| Career
! 
! 
! 
! 
! 
! 
! 
! 
! 
! 
|}

New Zealand
Watson made her senior debut for New Zealand on 27 August 2016 against England during the 2016 Netball Quad Series. She was a prominent member of the New Zealand team that won the 2019 Netball World Cup. She was also a member of the New Zealand team that won the 2021 Constellation Cup. On 3 March 2021, during the same series, Watson made her 50th test appearance for New Zealand. Alongside Gina Crampton, she also co-captained the team in the absence of Ameliaranne Ekenasio. Watson missed the 2021–22 international season due to a combination of pregnancy and recovering from ankle surgery. Watson was named in the 2022–23 squad after returning from maternity leave.

Personal life
In 2017 Watson got engaged to Will Carter, a blackcurrant farmer. In 2021 Watson announced she was pregnant with her partner, Santana Nicholls-Hepi. Santana has played netball for the New Zealand Defence Force.  In May 2022 the couple announced the arrival of their daughter Tia.

Honours
New Zealand
Netball World Cup
Winners: 2019
Constellation Cup
Winners: 2021 
Taini Jamison Trophy
Winners: 2020
Fast5 Netball World Series
Winners: 2016 
Southern Steel
ANZ Premiership
Winners: 2017
ANZ Championship
Minor premiers: 2016
Netball New Zealand Super Club
Winners: 2017
Mainland Tactix
ANZ Premiership
Runners up: 2020, 2021
Individual Awards

References

1990 births
Living people
New Zealand netball players
New Zealand international netball players
New Zealand international Fast5 players
2019 Netball World Cup players
Netball players from Christchurch
Mainland Tactix players
Southern Steel players
ANZ Premiership players
ANZ Championship players
People educated at St Kevin's College, Oamaru
University of Canterbury alumni
Lincoln University (New Zealand) alumni
New Zealand schoolteachers